The 2016 World Series of Poker was the 47th annual World Series of Poker (WSOP). Most of the events occurred May 31 – July 18 at the Rio All-Suite Hotel & Casino in Las Vegas, Nevada. There were 69 bracelet events, including the $10,000 No Limit Hold'em Main Event which began on July 9. The Main Event final table was reached on July 18, with the November Nine returning to play from October 30-November 1.

New events
Event #2: $565 Colossus II No Limit Hold'em - Returning to the schedule after setting a record for largest live tournament in 2015, changes to the event will include a $7 million guaranteed prize pool (an increase of $2 million), a guaranteed first prize of $1 million, and two additional starting flights. The money was reached during each starting flight and gave a player an opportunity to cash multiple times in the event.
Event #4: $1,000 Top Up Turbo No Limit Hold'em - Players cashing in $55 single table satellites, held both at the Rio and online on WSOP.com, will be able to double their starting stack.
Event #61: $1,000 Tag Team No Limit Hold'em - Featuring 2-4 player teams. The first team event at the WSOP since 1983.
In addition to these new events, the structure for $10,000 buy-in events has been changed with players now receiving five times the buy-in for a starting stack.

Event schedule
Source:

Player of the Year
Final standings as of July 18 (end of WSOP):

Main Event
The $10,000 Main Event No Limit Hold'em Championship began on July 9 with the first of three starting flights. The November Nine was reached on July 18, with the final table being contested over three days from October 30-November 1.

The Main Event attracted 6,737 players, generating a prize pool of $63,327,800. The top 1,011 players finished in the money, with the winner earning $8,005,310.

Performance of past champions

 * Indicates the place of a player who finished in the money

Other notable high finishes
NB: This list is restricted to top 30 finishers with an existing Wikipedia entry.

November Nine
*Career statistics prior to the beginning of the 2016 Main Event.

Final Table

References

External links
Official site

World Series of Poker
World Series of Poker
World Series of Poker